The 2011 Meath Senior Football Championship is the 119th edition of the Meath GAA's premier club Gaelic football tournament for senior graded teams in County Meath, Ireland. The tournament consists of 17 teams, with the winner going on to represent Meath in the Leinster Senior Club Football Championship. The championship starts with a group stage and then progresses to a knock out stage.

Skryne were the defending champions after they defeated Seneschalstown in the previous years final. 
 
Nobber were promoted after claiming the 2010 Meath Intermediate Football Championship title, their first year in the senior grade since being relegated in 1991 and only their 2nd ever period as a senior club.

On 16 October 2011, Summerhill claimed their 6th senior championship title when they defeated Dunshaughlin 0-14 to 1-9 after extra-time in a replay. Tony McDonnell raised the Keegan Cup for the 'Hill while Adrian Kenny claimed the 'Man of the Match' award.
 
Trim were relegated after 62 years as a senior club. Skryne are the only club to have operated at the senior grade for longer.

Team changes
The following teams have changed division since the 2010 championship season.

To S.F.C.
Promoted from I.F.C.
 Nobber  -  (Intermediate Champions)

From S.F.C.
Relegated to I.F.C.
 St. Ultan's

Participating teams
The teams that took part in the 2011 Meath Senior Football Championship are:

Group stage
There are 3 groups called Group A, B and C. The 3 top finishers in Group A and B and the top 2 finishers in Group C will qualify for the quarter finals. The 3 teams that finish last in their groups will play in a round-robin relegation play off. The loser will be relegated to the Intermediate division.

Group A

Round 1:
 Trim 0-6, 3-14 Summerhill, Pairc Tailteann, 17/4/2011,
 Oldcastle 1-11, 2-10 Wolfe Tones, Pairc Tailteann, 17/4/2011,
 Simonstown Gaels 1-4, 3-18 Blackhall Gaels, Dunsany, 17/4/2011,

Round 2:
 Trim 1-11, 0-14 Oldcastle, Kilskyre, 30/4/2011,
 Summerhill 0-13, 0-11 Blackhall Gaels, Pairc Tailteann, 1/5/2011,
 Simonstown Gaels 2-7, 1-10 Wolfe Tones, Pairc Tailteann, 1/5/2011,

Round 3:
 Trim 2-11, 1-17 Simonstown Gaels, Skryne, 13/5/2011,
 Wolfe Tones 2-6, 1-9 Blackhall Gaels, Trim, 14/5/2011,
 Summerhill 0-14, 1-5 Oldcastle, Athboy, 15/5/2011,

Round 4:
 Summerhill 0-7,  0-13 Simonstown Gaels, Pairc Tailteann, 10/6/2011,
 Oldcastle 0-10, 0-10 Blackhall Gaels, Bohermeen, 11/6/2011,
 Trim 1-4, 1-19 Wolfe Tones, Dunderry, 12/6/2011,

Round 5:
 Trim 1-15, 1-10 Blackhall Gaels, Summerhill, 7/8/2011,
 Summerhill 0-5,  1-9 Wolfe Tones, Pairc Tailteann, 7/8/2011,
 Oldcastle 0-11, 1-8 Simonstown Gaels, Kells, 7/8/2011,

Group B

Round 1:
 Dunshaughlin 1-10, 0-9 Seneschalstown, Pairc Tailteann, 15/4/2011,
 Donaghmore/Ashbourne 2-8, 2-9 Rathkenny, Pairc Tailteann, 16/4/2011,
 Navan O'Mahonys 2-10, 1-7 Nobber, Castletown, 17/4/2011,

Round 2:
 Rathkenny 1-5, 0-10 Seneschalstown, Pairc Tailteann, 30/4/2011,
 Dunshaughlin 1-12, 1-7 Nobber, Simonstown, 30/4/2011,
 Donaghmore/Ashbourne 0-9, 2-8 Navan O'Mahonys, Walterstown, 1/5/2011,

Round 3:
 Donaghmore/Ashbourne 0-14, 0-8 Dunshaughlin, Pairc Tailteann, 13/5/2011,
 Rathkenny 0-7, 0-14 Navan O'Mahonys, Seneschalstown, 15/5/2011,
 Nobber 2-12, 0-14 Seneschalstown, Rathkenny, 15/5/2011,

Round 4:
 Donaghmore/Ashbourne 0-12, 1-7 Nobber, Simonstown, 12/6/2011,
 Rathkenny 1-5, 0-11 Dunshaughlin, Pairc Tailteann, 12/6/2011,
 Navan O'Mahonys 1-5, 0-10 Seneschalstown, Pairc Tailteann, 12/6/2011,

Round 5:
 Donaghmore/Ashbourne 1-13, 0-13 Seneschalstown, Pairc Tailteann, 7/8/2011,
 Rathkenny 1-13, 0-8 Nobber, Kilmainhamwood, 7/8/2011,
 Navan O'Mahonys 3-14, 0-8 Dunshaughlin, Dunsany, 7/8/2011,

Group C

Round 1:
 Duleek/Bellewstown 1-8, 1-9 St Peters Dunboyne, Ashbourne, 15/4/2011,
 Walterstown 0-11, 1-12 St Patricks, Donore, 17/4/2011,
 Skryne  -  Bye,

Round 2:
 Skryne 1-8, 2-8 St Patricks, Ashbourne, 29/4/2011,
 Walterstown 1-8, 1-10 St Peters Dunboyne, Ratoath, 30/4/2011,
 Duleek/Bellewstown  -  Bye,

Round 3:
 Skryne 1-16, 0-15 Duleek/Bellewstown, Pairc Tailteann, 15/5/2011,
 St Peters Dunboyne 0-12, 0-11 St Patricks, Pairc Tailteann, 15/5/2011,
 Walterstown  -  Bye,

Round 4:
 Duleek/Bellewstown 1-12, 1-11 St Patricks, Pairc Tailteann, 11/6/2011,
 Skryne 1-5, 0-12 Walterstown, Dunsany, 12/6/2011,
 St. Peter's Dunboyne  -  Bye,

Round 5:
 Skryne 0-13, 0-7 St Peters Dunboyne, Pairc Tailteann, 6/8/2011,
 Duleek/Bellewstown 0-10, 2-12 Walterstown, Dunshaughlin, 6/8/2011,
 St. Patrick's  -  Bye,

Knock-out Stages

Relegation Play Off

Game 1: Trim 3-8, 1-16 Nobber, Bohermeen, 20/8/2011,

Game 2: Duleek/Bellewstown 2-9, 1-11 Trim, Pairc Tailteann, 9/9/2011,

 If necessary, all matches will have extra time.

Finals

Quarter-finals:
 Simonstown Gaels 1-12, 0-16 Dunshaughlin, Pairc Tailteann, 20/8/2011,
 St Peters Dunboyne 2-6, 3-14 Donaghmore Ashbourne, Pairc Tailteann, 21/8/2011,
 Summerhill 2-10 ,0-12 Navan O'Mahonys, Pairc Tailteann, 21/8/2011,
 Wolfe Tones 3-14, 0-9 Walterstown, Pairc Tailteann, 21/8/2011,

Semi-finals:
 Dunshaughlin 1-9 , 1-8 Donaghmore Ashbourne, Pairc Tailteann, 11/9/2011,
 Summerhill 1-7 , 0-6 Wolfe Tones, Pairc Tailteann, 11/9/2011,

Final:
 Dunshaughlin 0-10, 0-10 Summerhill, Pairc Tailteann, 2/10/2011,

Final Replay:
 Dunshaughlin 1-9, 0-14 Summerhill, Pairc Tailteann, 16/10/2011. A.E.T.

References

External links

Meath Senior Football Championship
Meath Senior Football Championship